Mariposa-Yosemite Airport  is a public airport located four miles (6 km) west of the central business district of Mariposa, in Mariposa County, California, United States. It is owned by the County of Mariposa.

Although most U.S. airports use the same three-letter location identifier for the FAA and IATA, Mariposa-Yosemite Airport is assigned MPI by the FAA but the IATA assigned MPI to Mamitupo, Panama).

Facilities and aircraft 

For the 12-month period ending March 2, 2007, the Mariposa-Yosemite airport had 32,000 aircraft operations, an average of 87 per day: 94% general aviation and 6% air taxi. There are 52 aircraft based at this airport: 96% single engine, 2% multi-engine and 2% ultralight.

There is one FBO on the field, Airborrn Aviation Services.

World War II

During World War II, the airport was designated as Mariposa Air Force Auxiliary Field, and was an auxiliary training airfield for Merced Army Airfield, California.

See also

 California World War II Army Airfields

Images

In July 2022, five CH-54s were assigned to fighting the Washburn Fire, based at the Mariposa-Yosemite Airport.

References

External links 

Airports in California
Transportation buildings and structures in Mariposa County, California
Sierra Nevada (United States)